Arshdeep is a given name. Notable people with this name include:

Arshdeep Bains (born 2001), Canadian ice hockey player
Arshdeep Dosanjh (born 1996), Australian volleyball player
Arshdeep Singh (disambiguation)

See also